POU domain, class 2, transcription factor 1 is a protein that in humans is encoded by the POU2F1 gene.

Interactions 

POU2F1 has been shown to interact with:

 EPRS, 
 Glucocorticoid receptor, 
 Glyceraldehyde 3-phosphate dehydrogenase, 
 Host cell factor C1, 
 Ku80, 
 MNAT1 
 NPAT, 
 Nuclear receptor co-repressor 2, 
 POU2AF1, 
 RELA, 
 Retinoid X receptor alpha,
 SNAPC4, 
 Sp1 transcription factor,  and
 TATA binding protein.

See also 
 Octamer transcription factor

References

Further reading

External links 
 

POU-domain proteins